Mykhaylo Oleksiyenko, or Mykhailo Oleksiienko (born 30 September 1986) is a Ukrainian chess grandmaster. He was Ukrainian Chess Champion in 2016.

Chess career
Oleksiyenko was awarded the title of Grandmaster by FIDE in 2005. He finished first in the Summer Olomouc Open in 2005, Breizh Masters tournament in 2006 and 2007, and Instalplast Open in 2006. In 2014 Oleksiyenko tied for first with Baadur Jobava and Sergey Fedorchuk, placing third on tiebreak, in the David Bronstein Memorial in Minsk. In 2015, he won the Karen Asrian Memorial in Jermuk with a score of 7/9 points, edging out Anton Korobov and Samvel Ter-Sahakyan on tiebreaks.

In 2016, Oleksiyenko won the Ukrainian Chess Championship.

References

External links
 
 
 
 
 Mykhaylo Oleksiyenko at Grandcoach.com 

1986 births
Living people
Ukrainian chess players
Chess grandmasters
Sportspeople from Lviv